Counts Icefall is a steep, heavily crevassed icefall at the juncture of the Ford Massif and the western end of the Bermel Escarpment, in the Thiel Mountains. It was surveyed by the United States Geological Survey Thiel Mountains party, 1960–61, and named by the Advisory Committee on Antarctic Names for Lieutenant Commander William D. Counts, U.S. Navy, who lost his life in the crash of a P2V Neptune aircraft soon after take-off from Wilkes Station on November 9, 1961.

Mount Counts is also named for William Counts, who was assigned to Air Development Squadron Six (VX-6) at the time of the crash.

References
 

Icefalls of Antarctica
Bodies of ice of Ellsworth Land